Dead Indian may refer to:

Dead Indian Campsite, an archeological site in Wyoming
Dead Indian Creek (Oregon)
Dead Indian Creek (Wyoming)
Dead Indian Pass, a mountain pass in Wyoming
Dead Indian Soda Springs

See also
 Dead Injun Creek